Patrick George Robertson (30 November 1895 – 8 October 1947) was an Australian rules footballer who played with Essendon in the Victorian Football League (VFL).

Notes

External links 

1895 births
1947 deaths
Australian rules footballers from Melbourne
Essendon Football Club players
People from Brunswick, Victoria